Pseudoauricularia is a genus of fungi in the family Agaricaceae. This is a monotypic genus, containing the single species Pseudoauricularia papuana, described as new to science in 1982 by Japanese mycologist Yosio Kobayasi.

See also
 List of Agaricaceae genera
 List of Agaricales genera

References

Agaricaceae
Monotypic Agaricales genera